Drop Dead Darling (US title: Arrivederci, Baby!) is a 1966 British-American black comedy film directed by Ken Hughes and starring Tony Curtis, Rosanna Schiaffino, Lionel Jeffries and Zsa Zsa Gabor.

Plot
A man goes around marrying wealthy women, and then murdering them. However, his third wife has married him with similar intentions.

Cast

 Tony Curtis ...  Nick Johnson 
 Rosanna Schiaffino ...  Francesca 
 Lionel Jeffries ...  Parker 
 Zsa Zsa Gabor ...  Gigi 
 Nancy Kwan ...  Baby 
 Fenella Fielding ...  Fenella 
 Anna Quayle ...  Aunt Miriam 
 Warren Mitchell ...  Conte de Rienz / Maximillian 
 Mischa Auer ...  Romeo 
 Noel Purcell ...  Capt. O'Flannery 
 Alan Gifford ...  American Brasshat 
 Joseph Furst ...  German Brasshat 
 Monti DeLyle ...  Butler 
 Bernard Spear ...  French Inspector 
 Eileen Way ...  Italian Dressmaker
 Bruno Barnabe ...  Head Waiter 
 Gábor Baraker ...  Gypsy Baron 
 Tony Baron ...  Baby's Boyfriend 
 Eunice Black ...  Matron 
 John Brandon ...  Radio Engineer 
 Windsor Davies ...  Radio Engineer 
 Franco De Rosa ...  Romano 
 John Fordyce ...  Boy in Orphanage 
 Yole Marinelli ...  First Maid 
 Miki Iveria ...  Second Maid 
 Henri Vidon ...  Priest 
 Raymond Young ...  Photographer 
 Jacqueline Bisset ...  Dancer

Production
The film was also known as You Just Kill Me, You're Dead Right, My Last Duchess, and The Careful Man.

In May 1962 Joshua Logan announced he would make a film about a wife killer called The Careful Man based on a Edmund Morris from an original story by Max Franklin. The film would be done with Seven Arts Pictures and Logan would produce and direct. It was described as a suspense melodrama.

In July 1962 Seven Arts announced The Careful Man would be one of 20 films it would make with MGM.

Filming started in August 1965 under the title You Just Kill Me with Ken Hughes as a director and Tony Curtis as star. Curtis said he took the job "because of the excellent script by Ken Hughes." Zsa Zsa Gabor's casting was announced in October. Filming took place in London at Shepperton Studios and in Cannes. Curtis said he was romantically interested in all his leading ladies but did not have affairs with any.

Curtis later said "the problem with the picture was that it was disjointed. The individual scenes were funny but the production company couldn't figure out a way to link them all together."

Reception
The Los Angeles Times called it "cleverly sketched".

Filmink called it "a frantic farce".

References

Notes

External links

1966 films
American crime comedy films
British crime comedy films
Films directed by Ken Hughes
1960s crime comedy films
Paramount Pictures films
1967 comedy films
1967 films
1966 comedy films
1960s English-language films
1960s American films
1960s British films